Piedmont is a small municipality within the Les Pays-d'en-Haut Regional County Municipality, Quebec, Canada, in the Laurentian Mountains of the administrative region of Laurentides. It is located along the North River and Autoroute 15 and Route 117, north of Montreal.

Police services are provided by the Régie intermunicipale de police de la Rivière-du-Nord, which also serves Prévost and some other nearby communities in the Laurentians.

Demographics
Population trend:
 Population in 2021: 3476 (2016 to 2021 population change: 17.8%)
 Population in 2016: 2950 (2011 to 2016 population change: 8.4%)
 Population in 2011: 2721 (2006 to 2011 population change: 14.0%)
 Population in 2006: 2386 (2001 to 2006 population change: 12.4%)
 Population in 2001: 2122
 Population in 1996: 1862
 Population in 1991: 1462

Private dwellings occupied by usual residents: 1822 (total dwellings: 2385)

Mother tongue:
 English as first language: 5.5%
 French as first language: 88.4%
 English and French as first language: 2.2%
 Other as first language: 3.3%

Education

Sir Wilfrid Laurier School Board operates Anglophone public schools:
 Morin Heights Elementary School (serves a portion) in Morin-Heights
 Saint Adèle Elementary School (serves a portion) in Saint-Adèle

See also
List of municipalities in Quebec

References

External links

 Site officiel Piedmont
 Tourisme Pays-d'en-Haut
 Piedmont at Commission de toponymie du Québec
 Statistics Canada

Municipalities in Quebec
Incorporated places in Laurentides